Streptomyces glaucescens is a bacterium species from the genus of Streptomyces which has been isolated from soil. Streptomyces glaucescens produces tetracenomycin C,  tetracenomycin D and tetracenomycin E.

Further reading

See also 
 List of Streptomyces species

References

External links
Type strain of Streptomyces glaucescens at BacDive -  the Bacterial Diversity Metadatabase

glaucescens
Bacteria described in 1958